Only Fools and Horses is a British sitcom created and written by John Sullivan and broadcast on BBC One. Seven series were broadcast between 1981 and 1991, followed by sporadic Christmas specials until 2003. The show centres on the lives of the Trotters, a working-class family of market traders who live in Peckham, London. Headed by Del Boy, his younger brother Rodney and their elderly Grandad (and later their Uncle Albert), the series shows their highs and lows in life as they strive to become millionaires through a variety of get-rich-quick schemes. The show achieved consistently high ratings, including a record 24.3 million viewers for the 1996 episode "Time on Our Hands", and was named Britain's Best Sitcom in a 2004 BBC poll.

Only Fools and Horses was nominated for, and received, a multitude of awards. It received its first BAFTA nomination in 1983, but lost out to Hi-de-Hi!. A year later it won its first major award, when it was named Comedy Programme of the Year by the Television and Radio Industries Club. The show was nominated for eight BAFTAs for best comedy series, winning in 1988, 1990 and 1996. It also won three British Comedy Awards, a National Television Award, a Royal Television Society Award and another TRIC award in 1997. For his portrayal of Del Boy, David Jason won two BAFTAs (from six nominations), three British Comedy Awards, two National Television Awards and one Royal Television Society Award. Nicholas Lyndhurst received three BAFTA nominations. In 1997 John Sullivan won the Writers' Guild of Great Britain award for Best Situation Comedy.

Awards

BAFTA

British Comedy Awards

National Television Awards

Royal Television Society

Television and Radio Industries Club Awards

Other

References

Only Fools and Horses
Only Fools and Horses
Awards and nominations received by Only Fools and Horses